Reuben Grice (1886–1967) was an English professional footballer who played as a winger.

References

1886 births
1967 deaths
People from Ruddington
Footballers from Nottinghamshire
English footballers
Association football midfielders
Notts County F.C. players
Rotherham County F.C. players
Burnley F.C. players
English Football League players